In mathematics, thin set may refer to:
 Thin set (analysis) in analysis of several complex variables
 Thin set (Serre) in algebraic geometry
 In set theory, a set that is not a stationary set

Thin set can also refer to thin set mortar.

See also 
 Meagre set
 Shrinking space
 Slender group
 Small set
 Thin category